In mathematics, a pseudomanifold is a special type of topological space. It looks like a manifold at most of its points, but it may contain singularities. For example, the cone of solutions of  forms a pseudomanifold.

A pseudomanifold can be regarded as a combinatorial realisation of the general idea of a manifold with singularities.  The concepts of orientability, orientation and degree of a mapping make sense for pseudomanifolds and moreover, within the combinatorial approach, pseudomanifolds form the natural domain of definition for these concepts.

Definition 

A topological space X endowed with a triangulation K is an n-dimensional pseudomanifold if the following conditions hold:

 (pure)  is the union of all n-simplices.
 Every  is a face of exactly one or two n-simplices for n > 1.

Implications of the definition 

Condition 2 means that X is a non-branching simplicial complex.
Condition 3 means that X is a strongly connected simplicial complex.
For n≥3 there are examples of combinatorial non-pseudomanifolds that are strongly connected through sequences of   satisfying Condition 2.

Decomposition 

However, in general, construction by gluing can lead to non-pseudomanifoldness (see Figure 2). 
Nevertheless it is always possible to decompose a non-pseudomanifold surface into manifold parts cutting only at singular edges and vertices (see Figure 2 in blue). For some surfaces several non-equivalent options are possible (see Figure 3).

On the other hand, in higher dimension, for n>2, the situation becomes rather tricky. 
 In general, for n≥3, n-pseudomanifolds cannot be decomposed into manifold parts only by cutting at singularities (see Figure 4). 

 For n≥3, there are n-complexes that cannot be decomposed, even into pseudomanifold parts, only by cutting at singularities.

Related definitions

A pseudomanifold is called normal if the link of each simplex with codimension ≥ 2 is a pseudomanifold.

Examples 
A pinched torus (see Figure 1) is an example of an orientable, compact 2-dimensional pseudomanifold.
(Note that a pinched torus is not a normal pseudomanifold, since the link of a vertex is not connected.)
 Complex algebraic varieties (even with singularities) are examples of pseudomanifolds.
(Note that real algebraic varieties aren't always pseudomanifolds, since their singularities can be of codimension 1, take xy=0 for example.) 
 Thom spaces of vector bundles over triangulable compact manifolds are examples of pseudomanifolds.
 Triangulable, compact, connected, homology manifolds over Z are examples of pseudomanifolds.
 Complexes obtained gluing two 4-simplices at a common tetrahedron are a proper superset of 4-pseudomanifolds used in spin foam formulation of loop quantum gravity. 
Gluing can induce non-pseudomanifoldness.

See also 
Stratified space

References 

Topological spaces
Manifolds